Nicasio "Asiong" Rodriguez Salonga  (October 11, 1924 – October 7, 1951), nicknamed the "Hitler" or "Hito" of Tondo, was an infamous Filipino gangster whose notorious life had been portrayed in several movie versions in 1961 (by Joseph Estrada), 1977 (by Rudy Fernandez), 1990 and 2011 (both played by George Estregan Jr.).

History
Asiong was considered one of the Philippines' public enemies where he reigned and dominated Manila's then-known mob district, Tondo, for several years. Asiong as a gang leader had 12 loyal members in his group, with 4 hideouts in Manila (Tondo, Binondo, Quiapo & Pier). Salonga's name had been linked to illegal possession and sale of firearms, homicide, collection of sum of money from businessmen, and other unknown nefarious cases from which somehow he always managed to squirm out of arrest. Despite this reputation, Salonga was still considered a hero by many local residents, thus earning him the nickname "Robin Hood of Tondo". Asiong was recognized by many in Metro Manila due to the frequent appearances of his name in newspaper headlines. The only record of Salonga in the Supreme Court was dated March 28, 1946, in relation to his arrest without warrant on January 10 of the same year.

He was shot dead in 1951 by one of his companions, allegedly in a drinking spree, Ernesto Reyes along with Joe David, which had been speculated as a double cross for fellow gang leader, and also Salonga’s rival, Carlos Capistrano (aka. Totoy Golem) whom Reyes worked for. Some sources also pointed politics as another angle behind the killing. Salonga's death occurred prior to his 27th birthday.

Media portrayal
 First portrayed by Joseph Estrada in the 1961 film, Asiong Salonga
 Portrayed by Rudy Fernandez in the 1978 film, Salonga
 Portrayed by E.R. Ejercito in the 2011 film, Manila Kingpin: The Asiong Salonga Story

Popular culture
Pugad Baboy dog character Polgas plays as "Asong Salonga" a parody version of Asiong Salonga was seen on Pugad Baboy Vol. 26 Comic Book.

See also
 Nardong Putik

References

1924 births
1951 deaths
Deaths by firearm
Filipino gangsters
People of American colonial Philippines
People from Tondo, Manila
Tagalog people